The Bauland is a Gäu landscape in the northeast of the German state of Baden-Württemberg. It is a natural region within the Neckar and Tauber Gäu Plateaus (major unit 12) in the South German Scarplands.

Location 
The Bauland is a Gäu landscape in the northeast of the German state of Baden-Württemberg. It is a natural region within the Neckar and Tauber Gäu Plateaus (major unit 12) in the South German Scarplands. It lies between the Odenwald forest and the Tauber, Jagst and Neckar rivers within the counties of Main-Tauber-Kreis and Neckar-Odenwald-Kreis. It also reaches into Hohenlohekreis and the county of Heilbronn. The Bauland is no. 128 in the classification system of the Handbook of Natural Region Divisions of Germany.

Etymology
The name Bauland goes back to the word Ponland which meant a "strip of land in which beans are cultivated" (from the Middle High German pône). 
The Bauland is colloquially known as Baden Siberia (Badisch Sibirien) due to its climate.
It is home to a form of spelt crop called Grünkern.

Villages in the Bauland 

 Adelsheim
 Ahorn
 Altheim
 Billigheim
 Buchen (Odenwald)
 Elztal
 Hardheim
 Höpfingen
 Külsheim
 Osterburken
 Ravenstein
 Rosenberg
 Schefflenz
 Seckach
 Walldürn

Sights 
 The over 600-metre-long Eberstadt Dripstone Cave (Eberstadter Tropfsteinhöhle) which is the accessible part of the Eberstadt Cave Worlds (Eberstadter Höhlenwelten)
 Doline fields as witnesses of the karst landscape
 Upper Germanic-Rhaetian Limes
 Adelsheim: Historic old town, Bauland Local History Museum
 Osterburken: Roman Museum, Roman castra

References

Literature 
  Published in 9 issues in 8 books from 1953–1962, updated map at 1:1,000,000 scale with major units: 1960.

External links 

 

Regions of Baden-Württemberg
Natural regions of the Neckar and Tauber Gäu Plateaus